Celestial Wives of the Meadow Mari (translit. Nebesnye zheny lugovykh mari) is a 2012 Russian erotic drama film directed by Aleksei Fedorchenko. The film was shot in Mari language and tells 23 different tales influenced by the Mari folklore. Each of these stories represents the specific approach to sexuality of "the last authentic pagans in Europe". In view of this, the film could be considered a Mari "Decameron".

The film won the main prize at the 12th New Horizons Film Festival, Wrocław, and was screened in the Vanguard section at the 2013 Toronto International Film Festival.

Cast
 Yuliya Aug
 Yana Esipovich
 Vasiliy Domrachyov
 Darya Ekamasova
 Olga Dobrina
 Yana Troyanova
 Olga Degtyaryova
 Aleksandr Ivashkevich
 Yana Sekste

Reception
The film was awarded Grand Prix and 20.000 EUR at the New Horizons Film Festival in Wrocław. The verdict of the jury (Béla Tarr, Dominga Sotomayor-Castillo, Edgar Pêra, Joanna Kos-Krauze and Christoph Terhechte) was as follows:

"For the tenderness, empathy, respect for the human dignity with a great sense of humor and imagination.
This film makes a hope for the freedom of arts and also features the most likeable zombie in film history."

References

External links
 

2012 films
2010s erotic drama films
Russian drama films
Mari-language films
Films set in Mari El
Films directed by Aleksey Fedorchenko